Daniel "Danny" Clark OAM (born 30 August 1951 in George Town, Tasmania, Australia) is a retired track cyclist and road bicycle racer from Australia, who was a professional rider from 1974 to 1997. He won five world championships and at the 1972 Summer Olympics in Munich, West Germany, came second in the 1,000m time trial.

Clark was often fastest finishing rider in six-day races, especially as Patrick Sercu slowed after the mid-1970s. Clark and the British rider, Tony Doyle, won many six-day races. Clark enjoyed the party atmosphere of the races, and continued to work in them as a Derny pacer after retiring.

Biography

Clark began cycling on a bike borrowed from a local enthusiast, which he used for three months before acquiring his eldest brother's semi-racer. He became one of the most successful riders in six-day racing in the 1970s and 1980s, winning 74 races, second to Patrick Sercu's 88. Most of these wins came after a crash in the 1983 Frankfurt six-day which broke his hip. Clark still carries a plate inserted to help the fracture heal and said that when sprinting or climbing, only his right leg delivered full power.

Clark won the Australian one-mile penny-farthing championship in Evandale, Tasmania, in 1989, beating the Briton Doug Pinkerton and Matthew Driver.

He lives in Surfers Paradise, near Brisbane.

Major results

Olympic Games
 Munich 1972:
  Silver kilomètre

World championships
 Besançon 1980:
  Keirin
 Brno 1981:
  Keirin
  Silver, points
 Leicester 1982:
  Silver, keirin
 Zurich 1983:
  Silver, keirin
 Bassano del Grappa 1985:
  Silver, Motor-paced
 Vienna 1987:
  Silver, motor-paced
 Ghent 1988:
  Motor-paced
 Maebashi 1990:
  Bronze, motor-paced
  Bronze, points
 Stuttgart 1991:
  Motor-paced

Six-days 
 Nouméa: 1972 with Malcom Hill
 Sydney: 1974 with Frank Atkins
 Ghent: 1976, 1979, 1982 with Don Allan, 1986 with Tony Doyle, 1987, 1994 with Etienne De Wilde, 1990 with Roland Günther
 Münster: 1977, 1980 with Don Allan, 1988 with Tony Doyle
 Rotterdam: 1977, 1978, 1985 with René Pijnen, 1981 with Don Allan, 1986 with Francesco Moser, 1987 with Pierangelo Bincoletto, 1988 with Tony Doyle
 Antwerp: 1978 with Freddy Maertens, 1987 with Etienne De Wilde
 London: 1978, 1980 with Don Allan
 Copenhagen: 1978 with Don Allan, 1986, 1987 with Tony Doyle, 1989, 1992 with Urs Freuler, 1990, 1991 with Jens Veggerby, 1995 with Jimmi Madsen
 Herning: 1978, 1982 with Don Allan
 Bremen: 1979 with René Pijnen, 1987 with Dietrich Thurau, 1988 with Tony Doyle, 1990 with Roland Günther, 1994 with Andreas Kappes
 Maastricht: 1979 with Don Allan, 1984 with René Pijnen, 1985, 1987 with Tony Doyle
 Hannover: 1980 with Don Allan
 Cologne: 1980 with René Pijnen, 1985 with Dietrich Thurau, 1989 with Tony Doyle
 Munich: 1980, 1981 with Don Allan, 1986 with Dietrich Thurau, 1988, 1990 with Tony Doyle
 Grenoble: 1980 with Bernard Thévenet, 1989 with Gilbert Duclos-Lassalle
 Dortmund: 1982 with Henry Rinklin, 1983, 1986, 1988 with Tony Doyle, 1987 with Roman Hermann, 1991, 1995 with Rolf Aldag
 Berlin: 1983, 1986, 1988 with Tony Doyle, 1984 with Horst Schütz, 1985 with Hans-Henrik Ørsted
 Bassano del Grappa: 1986 with Roberto Amadio and Francesco Moser, 1988 with Francesco Moser, 1989 with Adriano Baffi
 Launceston: 1986 with Tony Doyle
 Paris: 1986 with Bernard Vallet, 1988 with Tony Doyle
 Stuttgart: 1989 with Uwe Bolten, 1992 with Pierangelo Bincoletto, 1995 with Etienne De Wilde
 Buenos Aires: 1993 with Marcelo Alexandre
 Nouméa: 2000 with Graeme Brown

European championships
 Omnium 1978, 1979, 1984, 1985, 1986, 1988
 Derny 1985, 1986, 1990
 Motor-paced 1988
 Madison 1979 with Don Allan, 1988 with Tony Doyle

Honours
Clark received a Medal of the Order of Australia in 1986 and was inducted into the Sport Australia Hall of Fame in 1987. He received an Australian Sports Medal and a Centenary Medal in 2001.

References

External links
 
 
 
 
 

1951 births
Living people
Australian male cyclists
Australian track cyclists
Commonwealth Games medallists in cycling
Commonwealth Games silver medallists for Australia
Cyclists at the 1970 British Commonwealth Games
Cyclists at the 1972 Summer Olympics
Cyclists from Tasmania
Medalists at the 1972 Summer Olympics
Olympic cyclists of Australia
Olympic medalists in cycling
Olympic silver medalists for Australia
People from George Town, Tasmania
Recipients of the Australian Sports Medal
Recipients of the Centenary Medal
Recipients of the Medal of the Order of Australia
Sport Australia Hall of Fame inductees
UCI Track Cycling World Champions (men)
Medallists at the 1970 British Commonwealth Games